The Mitsubishi G1M was a long-range twin-engined attack bomber built by Mitsubishi for the Imperial Japanese Navy in the 1930s.

Design and development
The sole prototype G1M, initially designated Mitsubishi Navy Experimental 8-Shi Special Reconnaissance Aircraft and re-designated Mitsubishi Navy Experimental 8-Shi Land based Medium Attack Aircraft before first flight, was a predecessor of the Mitsubishi G3M, an important step for the Navy air force towards more capable land-based bombers such as the Mitsubishi G4M "Betty".

There is sometimes confusion between this aircraft and the Mitsubishi 3MT5 (also designated 'Mitsubishi G1M' and 'Navy Experimental 7-shi Carrier Attack Bomber'). The 3MT5 was a biplane and the 8-shi experimental Attack Bomber was a monoplane, two entirely different aircraft.

Specifications

References

Notes

Bibliography

 
 Peattie, Mark R. Sunburst: The Rise of Japanese Naval Air Power, 1909-1941. Annapolis, MD: Naval Institute Press, 2007. .

G1M
1930s Japanese bomber aircraft
Low-wing aircraft
Aircraft first flown in 1934
Twin piston-engined tractor aircraft